Carlos Ayala may refer to:

 Carlos Ayala (footballer) (born 1982), Salvadoran footballer
 Carlos Capriles Ayala (1923–2014), Venezuelan journalist, historian and ambassador
 Carlos Ayala Vargas (born 1980), Spanish politician